Ichi, the number one in Japanese numerals
Ichi (film), a 2008 Japanese film
Ichi (scarification), a type of facial scarring traditionally used by the Igbo people of West Africa
Ichi, Iran, a village in Isfahan Province, Iran
Ichi, Nigeria, a town in Ekwusigo Local Government Area, Nigeria
International Classification of Health Interventions
Ichiro Suzuki or Ichi (born 1973), Japanese baseball player
ICHI (musician), musician and husband of Rachael Dadd
IChI (IUPAC chemical identifier), the original name for the International Chemical Identifier

See also
Ichi the Killer (disambiguation)
Ichiban (disambiguation)